is a Japanese black-and-white art film released in 1969. It was directed by Yoshishige Yoshida, who wrote it in cooperation with Masahiro Yamada. It is the first film in Yoshida's trilogy of Japanese radicalism, followed by Heroic Purgatory (1970) and Coup d'Etat (1973).

The film touches upon many themes, such as free love, anarchism and the relationship between the past, the present, and the future. Although the film is a biography of anarchist Sakae Ōsugi, Yoshida states that he didn't focus on Ōsugi as a historical character per se, but rather on how reflecting on the present influences reflecting on the future.

Like most of Yoshida's films, Eros + Massacre is characterized by its immense visual beauty and richness in psychological and historical complexities, and features the director's wife, actress Mariko Okada. The film is known for Yoshida's distinct visual style, with bright exposure and unusual ways of framing actors.

The final cut of the film is currently streaming on Tubi, and the director's cut was released by Arrow Films on Blu-ray as part of the Love + Anarchism box set.

Background 

The film is a biography of anarchist Sakae Ōsugi, who was assassinated by the Japanese military in 1923. The story tells of his relationship with three women: Hori Yasuko, his wife; Noe Itō, his third lover, who was to die with him; and his jealous, second lover, Masaoka Itsuko, a militant feminist who attempts to kill him in a tea house in 1916. Parallel to the telling of Ōsugi’s life, two students (Eiko and Wada) do research on the political theories and ideas of free love that he upheld. Some of the characters from the past and from the present meet and engage the themes of the film.

Plot 

The film begins with Eiko, a student, learning about Noe Itō's life by interviewing her daughter, Mako. Eiko is shown to believe in Ōsugi's principles of free love. She is also connected with an underground prostitution ring and is questioned by a police inspector. Wada, another student, spends his time philosophizing with Eiko and playing with fire. The two sometimes engage in re-enactments of lives of famous revolutionaries and martyrs.

Their story is interwoven with the retelling of Ōsugi's later years and death. The scene where Itsuko tries to take Ōsugi's life is retold several times with differing results. The 1920s scenes in general follow a different pace than the 1960s scenes, both musically and stylistically.

In the final scene, Eiko's lover, a film director, commits suicide by hanging himself with a length of film. Eiko and Wada gather all of the 1920s characters and take a group picture of them. The two then leave the building.

Themes
In a 1970 interview for the magazine Cahiers du Cinéma, Yoshida explains: "The fundamental theme is: how to change the world, and what is it that needs to be changed? Reflecting on the present situation through the medium of an era already past, I came to believe that Osugi’s problems continue to be ours. Osugi is very well known in Japan – one could say almost legendary: he is someone who spoke of free love. He was assassinated in 1923 by an official of the state, massacred by the power of the state. This is what all Japanese historians believe; but this historical estimation only enlightens the past, and not the future. In making this film, I wanted to transform the legend of Osugi by means of the imaginary. Sure enough, Osugi was oppressed by the power of the state in his political activities. But most of all, he spoke of free love, which has the power to destroy the monogamous structure, then the family, and finally the state. And it was this very escalation that the state could not allow. It was because of this crime of the imaginary (or "imaginary crime") that the state massacred Osugi. Osugi was someone who envisioned a future.

Style
The two time periods are filmed in different styles. The 1920s scenes are slow, talky, with elements of kabuki theatre. They are accompanied by dramatic orchestral music, while Yoshida uses architectural elements to portray alienation and distant relations between the characters by filming their faces and bodies separated by windows, doors, and so on. On the other hand, the 1960s scenes are more avant-garde in terms of free-form visual approach and their psychedelic rock soundtrack.

The film, however, does not use flashbacks, and instead deliberately complicates the distinction between past and present, allowing characters to cross these boundaries. He stated in an interview: "I adopted a style that brings Osugi back into the contemporary period. Therefore, when Noe Itō at age 18 comes to Tokyo for the second time having been called by [the feminist activist] Raicho Hitatsuka, she arrives at the contemporary Shinbashi Station with the shinkansen in the background and takes a rickshaw through today's Ginza. Ultimately, the frames of past and present completely disappear, in this way, there is the sense that contemporary young women and Noe Itō are able to converse. Therefore, this is one way in which I challenge history." It is not just the framing of the film that brings historical characters into the present: the characters themselves reject the distinction at the opening of the film, when Eiko and Mako pun on the shared ko ending of their names, naming each other as alter-egos, and Mako refuses to take part in the interview as Itō's daughter. Instead, actress Mariko Okada takes on the role of Noe Itō herself. In this way, the film depicts Itō as "derived from the contemporary Eiko's imagination".

To accentuate the notion of history being perceived falsely, the transitions between the two periods often feature characters seen from mirrors and reflected surfaces. For example, in the scene where Itō gets introduced to the staff journalist Hiraga Haruko, Yoshida frames their inverted reflections in a pond as they're conversing. This is part of a general aim among Yoshida and his avant-garde contemporaries to subvert viewer expectations by destabilizing simple, linear narratives, forcing the realization that what the spectator sees is a series of fabrications that can only be given meaning by the interpretation of the spectator themselves. This "denial of the self" ("") is related to the "death of the author" concept.

Mathieu Capel writes: "does the past exist beyond the words that state and organize it? Is what we call "world" anything but a tracery of "world views"? Then, how unlikely would it be for Itō Noe and Eiko to meet in a contemporary setting? In a probably conscious way, Yoshida grasps the same questions as contemporary structuralist thinkers do, mostly their obsession of the "text", with logos as the leading organization principle."

Director's cut 
The film was completed in 1969, and Ichiko Kamichika, who had survived the massacres of the Great Kanto Earthquake, requested Yoshida to have a private screening of the film before it was released to cinemas. Unhappy with the way that Yoshida had portrayed her, Kamichika refused him the right to release the film because she considered it an invasion of her privacy. Because of this, Yoshida removed about an hours worth of material from the film (mostly scenes with Kamichika) and renamed her character to Itsuko Masaoka. Even after this, Kamichika was still adamant to not let Yoshida release the film, and ended up suing him for invasion of privacy. Yoshida would end up winning the case and released the film.

It wouldn't be until 2002 (25 years after Kamichika's death) that Yoshida's original cut would be released to the public. However, due to there only existing one heavily damaged film print, the cut that was released is said to be missing around nine minutes of footage, all of which is considered lost.

Cast
 Mariko Okada as Noe Itō/Mako
 Toshiyuki Hosokawa as Sakae Ōsugi
 Yuko Kusunoki as Itsuko Masaoka
 Etsushi Takahashi as Jun Tsuji
 Toshiko Ii as Eiko Sokutai
 Daijirō Harada as Kiwamu Wada

Reception
Allan Fish, writer for Wonders in the Dark, considered Eros + Massacre to be the greatest film ever made. He writes: "Upon watching this film for the first time, even in the shorter 166m version that was for a long time the only one available anywhere with English subtitles, one is left drained, a quite literal mental wreck.  Even those versed in the seminal works of Yoshida’s contemporaries, Oshima and Imamura, will be unprepared for this.  That his work still remains unavailable to the English speaking world, barely mentioned in any major film guide or tome, is one of the greatest oversights of accepted film reference literature.  If he only made this one film, Yoshida would be recognised as a giant."

David Desser named his book, Eros plus massacre: an introduction to the Japanese new wave cinema, after the film.

See also
 Amakasu Incident

References

Sources

External links
 
 
 

1969 films
1960s biographical films
1960s avant-garde and experimental films
Japanese biographical films
Japanese avant-garde and experimental films
Films about anarchism
Anarchism in Japan
Films directed by Yoshishige Yoshida
Films set in the 1910s
Films set in the 1920s
Films set in the Taishō period
Films set in the 1960s
1960s Japanese films